Spyros Balomenos (born 28 February 1979) is a Greek handball player. He competed in the men's tournament at the 2004 Summer Olympics.

References

1979 births
Living people
Greek male handball players
Olympic handball players of Greece
Handball players at the 2004 Summer Olympics
Sportspeople from Athens
IK Sävehof players